Stone circle may refer to:

Structures
 Stone circle (Megalithic)
 Stone circle (Iron Age)
 Stone Circles (Hong Kong)
 Senegambian stone circles
 some Australian Aboriginal stone arrangements are described as "stone circles"
 Eneabba Stone Arrangement (Circle of Stones), near Leeman, WA, Australia
 Ring of Stones (aka Circle of Stones), a 1656 shipwreck marker near Perth, WA, Australia

Other uses
 The Stone Circle, a novel by Elly Griffiths

See also

 
 List of stone circles
 Henge, neolithic structures
 Circlestone, Arizona, USA; an indigenous structure
 Ring of stone (disambiguation)